Denver Township is the name of some places in the U.S. state of Michigan:

 Denver Township, Isabella County, Michigan
 Denver Township, Newaygo County, Michigan

See also 
 Denver Township (disambiguation)

Michigan township disambiguation pages